Vítor Manuel de Almeida Gonçalves (born 25 February 1944) is a former Portuguese footballer, who played as a midfielder.

External links 
 
 

1944 births
Living people
Portuguese footballers
Association football midfielders
Primeira Liga players
Sporting CP footballers
Portugal international footballers